Kurban Kurbanov (born 21 March 1985 in Makhachkala, Dagestan) is an Uzbek freestyle wrestler from Russia. He competed at the 2008 and 2012 Summer Olympics in the 96 kg category and finished in seventh and fifth place, respectively. He was the silver medalist at the 2010 Asian Games.
He won the 2011 Asian Freestyle Wrestling Championship. He trains in Gamid Gamidov Wrestling club.

References

External links
 Bio on fila-wrestling.com
 

1985 births
Living people
Sportspeople from Makhachkala
Uzbekistani male sport wrestlers
Olympic wrestlers of Uzbekistan
Wrestlers at the 2008 Summer Olympics
Wrestlers at the 2012 Summer Olympics
Asian Games medalists in wrestling
Asian Games silver medalists for Uzbekistan
Wrestlers at the 2010 Asian Games
Medalists at the 2010 Asian Games
World Wrestling Championships medalists